Hail! is a heavy metal supergroup / cover band, formed in 2009. The band originally included Slipknot bassist Paul Gray until his sudden death in 2010.

Members
The band features a rotating lineup; the following people have played under the moniker:

 Tim "Ripper" Owens (ex-Judas Priest, ex-Iced Earth) – vocals
 Whitfield Crane (Ugly Kid Joe) – vocals
Steve "Zetro" Souza (Exodus) – vocals
Phil Demmel (ex-Machine Head) – guitars
 Andreas Kisser (Sepultura) – guitars
 Glen Drover (ex-Megadeth) – guitars
 David Ellefson (ex-Megadeth) – bass
 James LoMenzo (Megadeth) – bass
 Paul Gray (ex-Slipknot) – bass
 Jimmy DeGrasso (ex-Megadeth) – drums
 Mike Portnoy (ex-Dream Theater) – drums
 Paul Bostaph (Slayer) – drums
 Roy Mayorga (Stone Sour) – drums
Chris Adler (ex-Lamb of God) – drums

References

External links
 
 

Heavy metal supergroups
Musical groups established in 2009